Kosmos 750 ( meaning Cosmos 750), also known as DS-P1-I No.15 was a satellite which was used as a radar target for anti-ballistic missile tests. It was launched by the Soviet Union in 1975 as part of the Dnepropetrovsk Sputnik programme.

It was launched aboard a Kosmos-2I 63SM rocket, from Site 133/1 at Plesetsk. The launch occurred at 09:10 UTC on 17 July 1975.

It decayed from orbit on 29 September 1977.

Kosmos 750 was the fifteenth of nineteen DS-P1-I satellites to be launched. Of these, all reached orbit successfully except the seventh.

See also

1975 in spaceflight

References

1975 in spaceflight
Kosmos satellites
Spacecraft launched in 1975
Dnepropetrovsk Sputnik program